Přerov District(German: Bezirk Prerau) is a district (okres) within the Olomouc Region of the Czech Republic. Its capital is the city of Přerov.

List of municipalities
Bělotín - 
Beňov - 
Bezuchov - 
Bohuslávky - 
Bochoř - 
Brodek u Přerova - 
Buk -
Býškovice - 
Čechy - 
Čelechovice -
Černotín -
Císařov - 
Citov -
Dobrčice -
Dolní Nětčice - 
Dolní Těšice - 
Dolní Újezd - 
Domaželice - 
Dřevohostice - 
Grymov - 
Hlinsko - 
Horní Moštěnice - 
Horní Nětčice - 
Horní Těšice - 
Horní Újezd - 
Hrabůvka -
Hradčany - 
Hranice - 
Hustopeče nad Bečvou - 
Jezernice - 
Jindřichov - 
Kladníky - 
Klokočí - 
Kojetín - 
Kokory - 
Křenovice - 
Křtomil - 
Lazníčky - 
Lazníky - 
Lhota - 
Lhotka - 
Lipník nad Bečvou - 
Lipová - 
Líšná - 
Lobodice - 
Malhotice - 
Měrovice nad Hanou - 
Milenov - 
Milotice nad Bečvou - 
Nahošovice - 
Nelešovice - 
Oldřichov - 
Olšovec -
Opatovice - 
Oplocany - 
Oprostovice - 
Osek nad Bečvou - 
Paršovice - 
Partutovice - 
Pavlovice u Přerova - 
Podolí - 
Polkovice - 
Polom - 
Potštát - 
Přerov - 
Přestavlky - 
Prosenice - 
Provodovice - 
Radíkov - 
Radkova Lhota - 
Radkovy - 
Radotín - 
Radslavice - 
Radvanice - 
Rakov - 
Rokytnice - 
Rouské - 
Říkovice - 
Skalička - 
Soběchleby - 
Sobíšky - 
Stará Ves - 
Stříbrnice - 
Střítež nad Ludinou - 
Sušice - 
Šišma - 
Špičky - 
Teplice nad Bečvou - 
Tovačov - 
Troubky -
Tučín - 
Turovice - 
Týn nad Bečvou - 
Uhřičice - 
Ústí - 
Veselíčko - 
Věžky - 
Vlkoš - 
Všechovice - 
Výkleky - 
Zábeštní Lhota - 
Žákovice - 
Zámrsky - 
Želatovice

References

 
Districts of the Czech Republic